Sanritsu Denki is a Japanese video game publisher and developer. SIMS Co., Ltd. was established on June 12, 1991, as a joint venture of Sanritsu and Sega Enterprises, Ltd.

It was responsible for games such as:

Appoooh (Arcade) (1984)
Bank Panic (Arcade) (1984)
Out Run (Arcade) (1986)
Bomber Raid (Master System) (1988)
Assault City (Master System) (1990)
Peepar Time (Famicom) (1990)
Slap Shot (Master System) (1990)
Slaughter Sport (Mega Drive) (1990)
Fantasy Zone (Game Gear) (1991)
Gain Ground (Mega Drive, Master System) (1991)

See also
List of Sanritsu/SIMS games

External links
  
 Sanritsu/SIMS at the Game Developer Research Institute wiki

Video game companies of Japan
Video game development companies
Video game publishers